Biabad may refer to:
Biabad-e Qoba Siah
Biabad-e Saleh